Agdistis tsumkwe is a moth in the family Pterophoridae. It is known from South Africa and Namibia.

References

Agdistinae
Moths of Africa
Insects of Namibia
Moths described in 2001